Paralpenus atripes is a moth of the family Erebidae. It was described by George Hampson in 1909. It is found in Ghana.

References

Endemic fauna of Ghana
Spilosomina
Moths described in 1909